East Lancashire PCT was a large local NHS organisation.

The primary care trust commissioned (purchases) services as well as provides health services and was part of the strategic health authority for the North West (of England).  It was abolished in April 2013.

External links
 Official site

References

Health in Lancashire
Defunct NHS trusts
Organisations based in Lancashire